Biruveri Vaahaka is a Maldivian horror thriller anthology web series directed by Ilyas Waheed. The series features an ensemble cast including Ahmed Saeed, Mariyam Azza, Nathasha Jaleel, Nuzuhath Shuaib, Sharaf Abdulla, Aishath Rishmy and Ravee Farooq. Each episode of the series focuses on a separate storyline although the characters from the episodes are interrelated to form the main plot, which revolves around a secretive investigation team trying to undercover a series of supernatural suspected murders.

Cast and characters

Episode 1: Phone Call
 Furugan Mohamed as Ayan
 Hassan Saamih Mohamed as Saamih
 Naajiha Azoor as Jazlee
 Mariyam Shakeela as Muna; Ayan's mother

Episode 2: Lakunu
 Mariyam Waheedha as Dheema
 Aminath Alya Nazeer as Shaan
 Aishath Yalma Nazeer as Jinn Kid
 Fathimath Latheefa as Shaira
 Mohamed Afrah as Rasheed
 Mariyam Shakeela as Muna

Episode 3: Edhun
 Ibrahim Fairooz Adam as Niyaz
 Fathimath Sara Adam as Ziyana
 Thaathi Adam as Saamiya
 Suja Abdulla as Niyaz's neighbor
 Nuzuhath Shuaib as Saba; friend of Niyaz
 Sharaf Abdulla as Azaan; friend of Niyaz
 Nashidha Mohamed as a customer (special appearance)
 Ibrahim Jihad as a customer (special appearance)

Episode 4: Mask
 Vishal Mohamed as Ayya
 Aisha Ali as Lubaa
 Ibrahim Amaan Hussan as Lubaa's husband
 Fathimath Latheefa as Ayya Mom
 Ahmed Sharif as Razeen "Rocky"
 Ibrahim Fairooz Adam as Niyaz
 Hassan Saamih Mohamed as Samih
 Sharaf Abdulla as Azaan
 Hussain Shinan as neighbor
 Aishath Nazeeha as neighbor

Episode 5 and 6: Mas Dhathuru
 Ahmed Sharif as Razeen "Rocky"
 Hussain Haazim (Sandy) as Athoof 
 Ali Usam as Zalif "Zedey"
 Ali Nadheeh as Hazif "Happu"
 Aishath Razan Ramiz as Mizu
 Mariyam Azza as Lahoo
 Nathasha Jaleel as Nisha
 Sammah Mohamed as Saif
 Saamee Hussain Didi as Dimaah
 Ahmed Saeed as Zahir
 Mohamed Maahil as young Rocky
 Mariyam Haleem and Rocky's Grandmother

Episode 7: Honeymoon
 Nuzuhath Shuaib as Saba
 Sharaf Abdulla as Azaan
 Ibrahim Soba as Jaleel
 Aminath Rayya Binth Areef as Kid

Episode 8: Jaadhoogar
 Aishath Rishmy as Leesh
 Ahmed Azmeel as Soba
 Ibrahim Soba as Jaleel
 Ahmed Shamaan Nazeer as Niyaz
 Ali Yooshau as Ziyadh
 Nuzuhath Shuaib as Saba
 Sharaf Abdulla as Azaan

Episode 9: Mini
 Mariyam Azza as Lahoo
 Ahmed Saeed as Zahir
 Nathasha Jaleel as Nisha
 Sammah Mohamed as Saif
 Adam Rizwee as Rasheed
 Ahmed Shaihaan as Ismail
 Saamee Hussain Didi as Dimaah
 Ravee Farooq as Qalib (special appearance)
 Mohamed Manik as Yoosuf (special appearance)

Episode 10: Rah
 Aishath Rishmy as Leesh
 Nuzuhath Shuaib as Saba
 Ahmed Asim as Niyaz
 Ali Yooshau as Jaleel
 Sharaf Abdulla as Azaan
 Mariyam Azza as Lahoo
 Ahmed Saeed as Zahir
 Nathasha Jaleel as Nisha

Episode 11: Loabiverin
 Abdulla Muaz as Akram
 Fathimath Visama as Reen
 Ravee Farooq as Qalib
 Mariyam Azza as Lahoo

Episode 12: Foshi
 Nathasha Jaleel as Nisha
 Saamee Hussain Didi as Dimaah
 Mohamed Manik as Yoosuf
 Ahmed Saeed as Zahir
 Ravee Farooq as Qalib
 Mariyam Azza as Lahoo
 Nuzuhath Shuaib as Saba
 Sharaf Abdulla as Azaan

Episode 13: Haajaanu
 Nathasha Jaleel as Nisha
 Saamee Hussain Didi as Dimaah
 Mohamed Manik as Yoosuf
 Ahmed Saeed as Zahir
 Ravee Farooq as Qalib
 Mariyam Azza as Lahoo
 Fathimath Sara Adam as Ziyana
 Aisha Ali as Luba
 Vishal Mohamed as Ayya

Episodes

Development
The project was announced in November 2020, as fifteen-episodes anthology web series. Filming for the web series started in October 2020. A casting call was made by director Ilyas Waheed and an audition was held to launch new faces. In spite of the debut actors, it was reported the series will star prominent actors too. On 28 November 2020, it was reported that the series will star Mohamed Vishal, Fathimath Sara Adam, Mariyam Shakeela and Sharaf Abdulla. On 22 September 2021, it was announced that Aishath Rishmy, Ahmed Azmeel and Ibrahim Sobah has joined the cast for the eight episode of the series. Post production of the series was handed over to Orkeyz Inc, similar to Waheed's previous film ventures including Bavathi (2019) and Nina.

Soundtrack
The promotional song titled "Shaithona", performed by Andhala Haleem was released on 6 May 2022 to positive reviews from critics, with specific mention for its makeup and videography.

Release and reception
In June 2022, it was announced that the series will be officially streamed through DhiraaguTV.

Upon release, the series received positive reviews from critics, where Ahmed Rasheed from MuniAvas wrote: "the whole crew has executed their respective roles to its fullest leading the final project to be flawless". The reviews were directed at the performance of the cast and writer-director Ilyas' creativity for merging horror folklore into an "engaging visual treat".

Apart from the concept, screenplay, performance and direction, the series met extremely positive reviews from critics for its graphic designing and visual effects, especially for the makeup and visual designing for the seaworm portrayed by Aishath Razan Ramiz in the episode 6 titled Mas Dhathuru.

References

Serial drama television series
Maldivian television shows
Maldivian web series